Khawaja Muhammad Junaid (born 14 April 1966) is a Pakistani field hockey player. He won a bronze medal at the 1992 Summer Olympics in Barcelona.

References

External links

1966 births
Living people
Pakistani male field hockey players
Olympic field hockey players of Pakistan
Field hockey players at the 1992 Summer Olympics
Olympic bronze medalists for Pakistan
Olympic medalists in field hockey
Medalists at the 1992 Summer Olympics
Field hockey players at the 1990 Asian Games
Field hockey players at the 1994 Asian Games
Asian Games medalists in field hockey
Asian Games gold medalists for Pakistan
Asian Games bronze medalists for Pakistan
Medalists at the 1990 Asian Games
Medalists at the 1994 Asian Games
20th-century Pakistani people